Saman Fallah (born 12 May 2001) is an Iranian football defender who currently plays for Paykan in the Persian Gulf Pro League.

References

Living people
2001 births
People from Sari, Iran
Association football defenders
Iranian footballers
Paykan F.C. players
Persian Gulf Pro League players